The Elections for New York State Comptroller are held every four years. The next scheduled election was due to be held in 2022.  The current New York State Comptroller is Thomas DiNapoli.

The Comptroller is directly elected by First Past the Post.

Elections

1994

The 1994 election was held on November 8. Carl McCall had been appointed by the legislature to fill the remaining year of the term held by outgoing Comptroller Edward Regan. London had previously been the Conservative Party's candidate for Governor in 1990 and was offered the Comptroller spot according to many as a compromise between the Conservatives and Republicans:

1998

The 1998 election was held on November 3. Democratic incumbent Carl McCall defeated Republican challenger Bruce Blakeman by a wide margin:

4,985,514 ballots have been cast on that election. Out of them, 564,262 were declared blank, void or missing.

2002

The 2002 election was held on November 5. New York City Comptroller Alan Hevesi defeated former Assembly Minority Leader John Faso:

4,690,714 ballots have been cast on that election. Out of them, 533,227 were declared blank, void or missing.

2006

2010

2014

2018

2022

See also
 Politics of New York (state)
 New York gubernatorial elections
 New York Attorney General elections

References